Bhagatwadi is a village in the Karmala taluka of Solapur district in the Indian state of Maharashtra. The village is situated behind Ujjani Dam. The main occupation is sugarcane cultivation.

Geography
The village is situated near Pune Solapur railway line, known as central railway.

Demographics 
Bhagatwadi comprises 170 households as of the 2011 census of India. Its population numbered 823, including 448 males and 375 females, with 93 people aged six or younger.

References

Villages in Karmala taluka